Opuscula Mathematica is a mathematical research journal founded in 1937 in Kraków, Poland, by Professor Antoni Hoborski, an outstanding mathematician, the first Rector Magnificus of the Mining Academy (currently AGH University of Science and Technology), a co-establisher of the Polish Mathematical Society.

Articles published in Opuscula Mathematica are indexed, among others, in Emerging Sources Citation Index by Clarivate Analytics (formerly Thomson Reuters), Scopus, MathSciNet (Mathematical Reviews), Zentralblatt MATH (zbMATH), and Directory of Open Access Journals (DOAJ).

Focus 
Opuscula Mathematica publishes original research articles in the field of:
 Discrete Mathematics,
 Mathematical Physics,
 Nonlinear Analysis,
 Probability Theory and Statistics,
 Theory of Optimal Control and Optimization,
 Mathematical Economic Theory,
 Operations Research
and other areas of Applied Mathematics.

External links 
 Journal homepage

Mathematics journals
Publications established in 1937